"I Feel You" is a song by English electronic music band Depeche Mode, released on 15 February 1993 as their 27th UK single and the first single from their eighth studio album, Songs of Faith and Devotion (1993). The song peaked at number eight on the UK Singles Chart and also made number one and number three on the US Billboard Modern Rock Tracks chart and the Billboard Hot Dance Club Play chart. It is one of the band's highest-charting singles worldwide. The accompanying music video was directed by Anton Corbijn.

Details
"I Feel You" demonstrates a more rock-oriented sound, using more non-electronic instruments than ever before. For example, Alan Wilder plays drums, and Martin Gore plays the guitar, but with electronic sounds still included, like the synthesized tyre screeching intro. "I Feel You" has a compound time signature of 6/8. The 7" version of "I Feel You" is the same as the album version. The "Throb Mix" is a 12" version, but with incomplete lyrics. A part of the "Swamp Mix" is used as an interlude on the Songs of Faith and Devotion album between "Get Right With Me" and "Rush"; this was also used in the intro for the live arrangements of "I Feel You" that were played during their Devotional/Summer tours.

The single release contained "One Caress", a track from Songs of Faith and Devotion sung by Martin Gore. In the US, Sire/Reprise released "One Caress" as a promotional single. One promotional copy has the original version, and the other has the version from Songs of Faith and Devotion Live. There is no remix for the song.

Critical reception
In his weekly UK chart commentary, James Masterton wrote, "In a similar vein to "Personal Jesus" the track may not have quite the momentum to go Top 3 and is unlikely to win them any new fans." Sam Wood from Philadelphia Inquirer described the song as "a screeching blast of hellish white noise. A claustrophobic electro-blues shackled to a two-note guitar figure, "I Feel You" trumpets the onrush of a terrifying mystical experience."

Music video
The black-and-white music video for "I Feel You" was directed by Anton Corbijn. The woman in the video is English actress Lysette Anthony. There is also a music video for "One Caress", directed by Kevin Kerslake, that was filmed during one of the off-days of the Devotional Tour in the US. It is a promotional video that was later released on The Videos 86>98. Prior to its inclusion on The Videos 86>98, the music video for "One Caress" was frequently broadcast on MTV's Alternative Rock video block 120 Minutes and Sky One. On 2 September 1993, "I Feel You" was nominated in the MTV Video Music Awards.

Track listings

 7-inch, cassette: Mute / Bong 21, C Bong 21 (UK)
 "I Feel You" – 4:34
 "One Caress" – 3:30

 12-inch: Mute / 12 Bong 21 (UK)
A1. "I Feel You (Throb mix) – 6:47
A2. "I Feel You" (seven inch mix) – 4:34
B1. "I Feel You" (Babylon mix) – 7:53
B2. "One Caress" – 3:30

 Limited-edition 12-inch and CD: Mute / L12 Bong 21, LCD Bong 21 (UK)
 "I Feel You" (Life's Too Short mix) – 8:35
 "I Feel You" (Swamp mix) – 7:28
 "I Feel You" (Renegade Soundwave Afghan Surgery mix) – 4:58
 "I Feel You" (Helmet at the Helm mix) – 6:41

 CD: Mute / CD Bong 21 (UK)
 "I Feel You" (seven inch mix) – 4:34
 "One Caress" – 3:30
 "I Feel You" (Throb mix) – 6:47
 "I Feel You" (Babylon mix) – 7:53

 12-inch and maxi-cassette: Sire, Reprise / 0-40767, 4-40767 (US)
A1. "I Feel You" (Babylon mix) – 7:53
A2. "I Feel You" (Helmet at the Helm mix) – 6:41
A3. "I Feel You" (Afghan Surgery mix) – 4:58
A4. "One Caress" (album version) – 3:31
B1. "I Feel You" (Life's Too Short mix) – 8:33
B2. "I Feel You" (Swamp mix) – 7:26
B3. "I Feel You" (Throb mix) – 6:47

 Maxi-CD: Sire, Reprise / 9 40767-2 (US)
 "I Feel You" (single mix) – 4:35
 "One Caress" (album version) – 3:31
 "I Feel You" (Throb mix) – 6:47
 "I Feel You" (Babylon mix) – 7:53

 Maxi-CD: Sire, Reprise / 9 40784-2 (US)
 "I Feel You" (Life's Too Short mix) – 8:33
 "I Feel You" (Swamp mix) – 7:26
 "I Feel You" (Afghan Surgery mix) – 4:58
 "I Feel You" (Helmet at the Helm mix) – 6:41

Charts

Weekly charts

Year-end charts

Certifications

Notable cover versions

Placebo covered the song in 1999, and was released as a single-sided cassette. It was later released on Sleeping with Ghosts for the 2 CD version, which included a covers album.
Apollo 440 also recorded a cover on the tribute album For the Masses.
Former The Smiths songwriter and guitarist Johnny Marr released a cover of the song in support of Record Store Day 2015.

See also
List of number-one singles of 1993 (Finland)
List of number-one singles of 1993 (Spain)
Number one modern rock hits of 1993

External links
Single information from the official Depeche Mode web site
AllMusic review

References

1993 singles
1993 songs
2015 singles
Depeche Mode songs
Mute Records singles
Placebo (band) songs
Record Store Day releases
Songs written by Martin Gore
Number-one singles in Finland
Number-one singles in Greece
Number-one singles in Spain
Song recordings produced by Flood (producer)
Music videos directed by Anton Corbijn
Black-and-white music videos